was a town located in Asago District, Hyōgo Prefecture, Japan.

As of 2003, the town had an estimated population of 4,872 and a density of 43.50 persons per km2. The total area was 112.01 km2.

On April 1, 2005, Ikuno, along with the towns of Asago (former), Santō and Wadayama (all from Asago District), was merged to create the city of Asago and no longer exists as an independent municipality. It is the smallest town of the Asago District.

Geography
Ikuno is located at the geographical center of Hyogo prefecture. It borders the Harima district and Kamikawa town. Ikuno is elevated 300 meters above sea level and surrounded by mountains which composes 90% of the area. Maruyama river starts here and flows north into the Sea of Japan. Ichikawa river, which originates in Kurogawa (north-east Ikuno) flows through the town centre towards the inland sea.

Climate
The township of Ikuno is located in a basin. During the summer months it remains relatively hot with high humidity levels. Autumn and Spring are short lived seasons. Due to the elevation of Ikuno it receives infrequent bouts of snow. Ikuno receives a lot of rain during the summer months and often ravaged by typhoons. The annual precipitation is approximately 2,000 mm.

History
Mining was Ikuno's first industry, dating back to 807. The discovery of silver in the mountains surrounding the town made it a miner's hub. Mining continued here for nearly a thousand years, during which time copious amounts of copper and silver were mined. The town even was a POW camp during WWII. The mines were closed in the 1970s by Mitsubishi. Ikuno's population peaked in 1955 with over 11,000 people. Today, Ikuno is a town with thriving industries.

Tourist Attractions

Many of Ikuno's historical tourist spots can be access by walking from Ikuno train station. 

The Ikuno Silver Mine and Ikuno Mineral Museum are a famous and well known tourist spot in the area. Ore mining commenced soon after the warring state period in Japan (807 AD). This mine was also nicknamed, "Tenryo" as it was the main resource that financed the Tokugawa shogunate's fortune. In 1889, the mine became Imperial property. The main vein of the mine is 2.6 km long and houses a depth of 1 km. The major produce were coal, lead, gold and silver. Unfortunately, due to lack of profit in its later years mining at Ikuno officially ceased in 1973. Eventually the mine was converted into an educational center and museum.

Ikuno is also the culinary birthplace of "Hayashi rice" a stew-like beef dish served with rice. Click here for a list of restaurants serving Hayashi rice in Ikuno. This dish was a common appearance on the dinner tables of the mine residents when the town was bustling during the mining periods. Visitors to the Mine can taste this specialty at the upstairs restaurant, "Maronie" (マロニエ). 

Ikuno Kogen Heights, a huge highland located in the north-west area of Ikuno. The mountain ranges are 600 meters above sea level. The Kassel hotel can be found here along with a golf course, tennis court and hiking courses. 

The Ikuno Ginzan lake is nearby and very scenic. It is an entirely man-made lake and also features a dam. The lake's water is used for irrigation and industrial purposes downstream. Several recreational areas are available for picnics. Hiring a boat and/or fishing gear is also possible. Uogataki falls is nearby and is the local swimming spot. Further up the road is the Kurokawa valley. It is designated as the prefectural natural park of the Asago mountain range. The Kurokawa area also boosts a popular onsen and a dam.

Ikuno Castle was originally built circa 1394–1428 and its ruins can be found on the top of Kojozan (古城山) in the Kuchiganaya district of Ikuno. The castle acted as the local magistrate's and the Silver mine's administrative office in the Edo period until it was eventually abandoned.

The old tramcar road (pictured in the Kuchiganaya area above) is a remnant of the mineral transport system that was in place from the Kanagase mine tunnel to the old train station. It was built in 1920 and features several arches.

Another point of interest is the Takashi Shimura memorial and mining staff quarters (cooperate housing). Built in the Meiji era (1876) at peak the staff quarters was composed of 18 buildings. However, only 6 buildings remain and have undergone restoration and preservation efforts. One building is a dedicated memorial for the famous Japanese actor, Takashi Shimura. Shimura was born in the staff quarters where his father worked.  Shimura acted in Kurosawa's Seven Samurai and  To Live.

Notable Festivals

April Heikurō Matsuri (へいくろう祭) was founded in 2000 and is held at Ikuno Ginzan. This festival is used to celebrate the mining history of the town.

August Toronagashi event - As a part of the Obon festivities during the summer holidays the community gather around the Ichikawa river. Hand-made paper lanterns decorated by the people are floated down the river.

September: Kanaya Matsuri (銀谷祭り) is an annual event that takes place on the streets of the Kuchikanaya area. There are performances by the locals and houses along participating streets run small merchant stores selling handicrafts, tools, produce and food. The festival is to commemorate the history of the area when merchants would line the streets.

References

Dissolved municipalities of Hyōgo Prefecture
Asago, Hyōgo